The smalltooth stingray (Dasyatis rudis) is an obscure species of stingray in the family Dasyatidae, found in the Gulf of Guinea. It is known only from a stuffed specimen described by Albert Günther in 1870, which has since been lost. In 1970, Springer and Collette assigned a jaw, tail, and two embryos from off Sierra Leone to this species, but later investigation found that the jaw belonged to a guitarfish, and the tail and embryos to a different species, possibly Dasyatis hastata.

References

smalltooth stingray
Marine fauna of West Africa
smalltooth stingray
Taxa named by Albert Günther